Enrico Gaede (born 31 January 1982 in Stralsund, East Germany) is a German former footballer. He spent three seasons in the Bundesliga with Borussia Mönchengladbach and played 35 games.

References

External links
 

1982 births
20th-century German people
Association football midfielders
Borussia Mönchengladbach players
Borussia Mönchengladbach II players
Bundesliga players
2. Bundesliga players
FC Hansa Rostock players
German footballers
KSV Hessen Kassel players
Living people
People from Stralsund
Rot-Weiss Essen players
Sportfreunde Siegen players
Footballers from Mecklenburg-Western Pomerania